Mauro Rossi (born 1 June 1973) is a former Italian hurdler.

Biography
His personal best 13:48, set in 1998, is the seventh best Italian performance of all-time. In 1998 it was also the 29th world best performance of the year.

Achievements

National titles
He won six national championships at senior level. For three consecutive years, from 1996 to 1998, he won both the indoor edition on 60 m hs, than the outdoor on 110 m hs.

Italian Athletics Championships
110 metres hurdles: 1996, 1997, 1998
Italian Athletics Indoor Championships
60 metres hurdles: 1996, 1997, 1998

See also
 Italian all-time lists - 110 metres hurdles

References

External links
 
 Mauro Rossi at All-Athletics

1973 births
Living people
Italian male hurdlers
Athletics competitors of Fiamme Gialle
Athletes from Rome